Rajarshi Shahu College, Latur (R.S.M.L.) is a higher secondary education institution in the Latur, Maharashtra, India. The college was a pioneer in the development of the "Latur Pattern", which has been adopted and implemented by many other colleges across the state.

Establishment 
The college was established in 1970 by the Shiv Chhatrapati Shikshan Sanstha (Shiv Chhatrapati Educational Institution), Latur. Shahu's first principal was Dr.Janardhan Madhavrao Waghmare, who was the first pillar of Latur Pattern. The college has consistently produced Maharashtra State level toppers in the Higher Secondary School Certificate Examination (10+2) of the Maharashtra State Board of Secondary and Higher Secondary Education, Pune and the Common Entrance Test for four-year bachelor's degree courses in Medical and Engineering fields.

Recognition 
The college is also famous for the Chartered Accountant's examination preparation. Students who are willing to be Chartered Accountants do their higher secondary education and a three-year bachelor's degree in Commerce stream (B.Com.) and then take the Chartered Accountant's course. There is a large contribution of this college in creating and popularizing the "Latur Pattern". Mr. Anirudh Jadhav has major contributions in creating the Latur Pattern and making it widely known throughout India.
In 2004, RSML started Biotechnology UG and PG under visionary of Dr. Gopalrao Patil and Directorship of Prof. Vishwas Shembekar, which gives major turn to the college in terms of Research & Development at National and International level. Alumni of this department are spread throughout the globe and doing research with cutting-edge technologies and contributing in the Global Science knowledge.
The college has enrolled more than four thousand students (including Junior College).

Staff 
The total staff includes 77 teachers in the Senior College, 78 non-teaching staff and 63 teachers in the Junior College (Class 11 and 12).

Departments 
The college mainly conducts preparatory courses for the following competitive entrance examinations: MHT-CET, All India Engineering Entrance Examination (AIEEE), Maharashtra Public Service Commission (MPSC), Master of Business Administration (MBA) and MS-CIT (Maharashtra State Certificate in Information Technology). There are 21 departments including 7 Post Graduate departments. The college also offers courses such as Russian language, Additional English (second language), Sanskrit, Pali and Functional English (a vocational subject), M.Phil. (Geography). The teachers of Marathi, Pali, Geography, Economics, Sociology, Chemistry, Zoology & Fishery Science, Biotechnology and Physics guide the Ph.D. aspirants. The college introduced computer courses in 1998 on a non-grant basis. It is thus catering to the needs of higher secondary and higher education in this region.

Awards and accolades 
The college is affiliated to Swami Ramanand Teerth Marathwada University, Nanded and has achieved an A grade with 89.25% and CPE status from the National Assessment and Accreditation Council (NAAC), India. The college was awarded the Best Educational Institution Award at the hands of Dr. P.C. Alexander, Governor Of Maharashtra.

In 2013, the college became autonomous. Educational batch of 2013-2014 is the first batch of degree college as autonomous grade.

Courses offered

Degree courses 
 Competitive Examination Center Rajarshi Shahu Prabhodhini

Postgraduate courses

Research courses

References

External links
Rajarshi Shahu Mahavidyalaya, Latur website

Education in Latur
Educational institutions established in 1970